The Pung cholom (literally: "roar of the drum") is a dance form originated from Manipur, which is the soul of the Manipuri Sankirtana music and the classical Manipuri dance. The Pung cholom is a unique classical dance of Manipur. This dance may be performed by men or women and is usually a prelude to the Ras Lila. 
In this style, the dancers play the pung (a form of hand beaten drum) while they dance at the same time. Dancers need to be graceful and acrobatic at the same time. They use these acrobatic effects without breaking the rhythm or flow of music. The dance is marked by a gentle rhythm, which gradually builds up to a thunderous climax. Pung cholom borrows elements from the Manipuri martial arts, Thang Ta and Sarit Sarak and also from the traditional Maibi Jagoi.

Dances similar to Pung cholom
 Pungmul - South Korea and North Korea
 Khanjluri, Kazbeguri, Khevsuruli and Mtiuluri - Georgia
 Jangi - Azerbaijan 
 Yarkhushta - Armenia
 Qilaut -  Canada (Nunavut, Northwest Territories and Yukon), United States (Alaska), Denmark (Denmark) and Russia (Chukotka Autonomous Okrug)
 Karyenda - Burundi

References

External links
Poetry in Manipuri

Manipuri dance
Meitei culture